Events in the year 2017 in Malta.

Incumbents
 President: Marie-Louise Coleiro Preca
 Prime Minister: Joseph Muscat

Events

1 January – Malta takes over the six-month rotating Presidency of the Council of the European Union.
3 February – in the Malta Declaration (EU), European Union leaders vowed to slow the movement of migrants crossing the Mediterranean.
February 24-28 - The 2017 Carnival is held 
8 March – the Azure Window collapses after a heavy storm.
March 25 - Malta International Airport celebrates its 25th anniversary.
3 June – General election resulting in a continued Labour government.
29 June - Mater Dei celebrated its 10th anniversary.
3 November – Public funeral for Daphne Caruana Galizia at the Rotunda of Mosta.

Deaths
3 February – Joe Grima, politician (b. 1936).
16 October – Daphne Caruana Galizia, journalist and blogger (b. 1964).

References

 
Years of the 21st century in Malta
Malta
Malta
2010s in Malta